Hammerman is a Saturday morning cartoon, starring rapper MC Hammer, which aired for thirteen episodes on ABC in the fall of 1991. It was produced by DIC Animation City and Italian company Reteitalia S.p.A., in association with Spanish network Telecinco.

Synopsis
Youth center worker Stanley Burrell (Hammer's real name) owns a pair of magical dancing shoes (which are alive and can speak), which when worn cause Burrell to transform into the superhero Hammerman. He frequently gets advice from his "Gramps", who was a former owner of the shoes and was known as Soulman. While in the guise of Hammerman, Burrell was dressed in MC Hammer's signature purple Hammer pants and myriad golden chains.

The show was hosted by the real MC Hammer, who also sang the show's theme song, telling about the origin of Hammerman. Back in the 1960s and 1970s, Gramps (Robert Nameson) was the superhero Soulman, but as he grew older, he grew weaker and was forced to retire. Gramps and his granddaughter Jodie traveled to find the next new superhero. Their search was over when they met Stanley and he put on the shoes. Each episode, Hammerman faced various social issues; at the end of each episode, MC Hammer would speak to the audience and provide methods to address these issues themselves.

Cast
 MC Hammer - Hammerman/Stanley Burrell (live action)
 Neil Crone - Ludwig
 Clark Johnson - Hammerman (cartoon)
 Jeff Jones
 Miguel Lee
 Joe Matheson
 Susan Roman - Hammerman's Would-Be Girlfriend
 Ron Rubin - Righty
 Carmen Twillie - Fly Girls
 Louise Vallance - Jodie
 Maurice Dean Wint - Showbiz

Additional voices
 Philip Akin
 Réal Andrews
 Jason Burke
 George Buza
 Len Carlson
 Rob Cowan
 Michelyn Emelle
 Dan Hennessey - Boss Grindenheimer
 Marc Marut
 Greg Morton
 Jackie Richardson
 Judith Scott
 Errol Slue
 Michael Stark
 John Stocker - Defacely Marmeister
 Marlow Vella
 Richard Yearwood

Episodes
While the airdates and order of most episodes is unknown, "Defeated Graffiti", the first episode (as confirmed by MC Hammer's comments at the beginning of the episode), aired on September 7, 1991. The cartoon aired on Saturday mornings at 10 AM on ABC.

Critical reception
Entertainment Weekly journalist Dalton Ross listed Hammerman at the top of his list "Top 5 Most Ridiculous Things to Be Turned Into a Saturday Morning Cartoon", and called the show as "idiotic".

Home media
In 1994, 3 of the 13 episodes were released on VHS by Buena Vista Home Video. There are currently no plans for a DVD release.

References

External links
 
 

MC Hammer
American Broadcasting Company original programming
1990s American animated television series
1990s American black cartoons
1991 American television series debuts
1991 American television series endings
1990s Canadian animated television series
1990s Canadian black cartoons
1991 Canadian television series debuts
1991 Canadian television series endings
1991 Italian television series debuts
1991 Italian television series endings
Animation based on real people
Television series based on singers and musicians
Television series by DIC Entertainment
Parody superheroes
American children's animated superhero television series
American television series with live action and animation
Canadian children's animated superhero television series
Canadian television series with live action and animation
Italian children's animated superhero television series
Italian television series with live action and animation
Cultural depictions of American men
Cultural depictions of hip hop musicians
Black people in art